, commonly known by the name English as She Is Spoke, is a 19th-century book written by Pedro Carolino, with some editions crediting José da Fonseca as a co-author. It was intended as a Portuguese–English conversational guide or phrase book. However, because the provided translations are usually inaccurate or unidiomatic, it is regarded as a classic source of unintentional humour in translation.

The humour largely arises from Carolino's indiscriminate use of literal translation, which has led to many idiomatic expressions being translated ineptly. For example, Carolino translates the Portuguese phrase  as "raining in jars", when an analogous English idiom is available in the form of "raining buckets".

It is widely believed that Carolino could not speak English and that a French–English dictionary was used to translate an earlier Portuguese–French phrase book, written by José da Fonseca. Carolino likely added Fonseca's name to the book, without his permission, in an attempt to give it some credibility. The Portuguese–French phrase book is apparently a competent work, without the defects that characterize English as She Is Spoke.

The title English as She Is Spoke was given to the book in its 1883 republication, but the phrase does not appear in the original phrasebook, nor does the word "spoke".

Cultural appraisals and influence
Mark Twain said of English as She Is Spoke "Nobody can add to the absurdity of this book, nobody can imitate it successfully, nobody can hope to produce its fellow; it is perfect."

Stephen Pile mentions this work in The Book of Heroic Failures and comments: "Is there anything in conventional English which could equal the vividness of to craunch a marmoset?" The original has "to craunch the marmoset", an entry under the book's "Idiotisms and Proverbs". The term is presumably inspired by the marmot's large teeth, as many of the grotesque door knockers were figures holding the knocker clasped in their teeth. "Craunch" is an archaic term meaning 'to chew' or 'crunch'. See croquet.

Tristan Bernard wrote a very short comedy with a similar name,  (1899). Ionesco's  (1950) is mostly made of lines used out-of-context from inter-lingual conversation books.  British comedy television series Monty Python's Flying Circus made use of the theme of the mis-translating guide in the sketch "Dirty Hungarian Phrasebook" (1970), which may have been directly inspired by English as She Is Spoke.

Phrase examples 

In addition to the examples above, Carolino managed to create a number of words which added to the book's unintentionally comic effect. Many can be found in the "Familiar Dialogues" section and include the above "Sook here if I knew to tame hix".

Publication history

 1853 – In Paris, J.-P. Aillaud, Monlon e Ca published a Portuguese–French phrase book entitled  by José da Fonseca.  The Biblioteca Nacional de Portugal (National Library of Portugal) has a copy of this book with catalog number L.686P. Another copy of this book is in the Bibliothèque nationale de France (National Library of France) under the catalog number FRBNF30446608.
 1855 – In Paris, J.-P. Aillaud, Monlon e Ca published a Portuguese–English phrase book entitled  (literally, The new guide to conversation, in Portuguese and English, in Two Parts), with authorship attributed to José da Fonseca and Pedro Carolino.  A copy of this book is in the Bibliothèque nationale de France under the catalog number FRBNF30446609.  Another copy is in the Bodleian Library, Oxford.
 1883 – The book was published in London as English as She is Spoke.  The first American edition, published in Boston, also came out this year, with an introduction by Mark Twain.
 1969 – The book was re-published in New York by Dover Publications, under the title English as she is spoke; the new guide of the conversation in Portuguese and English.
 2002 – A new edition edited by Paul Collins was published under the Collins Library imprint of McSweeney's.
 2002 – Brazilian edition of the copies of the 1855 edition held in the Bibliothèque nationale de France and the Bodleian Library, published by Casa da Palavra, Rio de Janeiro.
 2004 – A revised paperback version of the above Collins Library edition was published.

Related titles 
The phrase inspired some other publications, notably:

 English as she is wrote (1883)
 English as she is taught (1887), also with introduction by Mark Twain
 Ingglish az she iz spelt (1885), by "Fritz Federheld" (pseudonym of Frederick Atherton Fernald)
 English Opera as She is Wrote (1918), opera burlesque organized by Jane Joseph satirizing operatic composers like Verdi, Wagner, Debussy, which Gustav Holst participated in
 Britain as she is visit, a spoof tourist guide in a similar style to the original book, by Paul Jennings, British Life (M Joseph, 1976)
 Elvish as She Is Spoke (2006), by Carl F. Hostetter, from  The Lord of the Rings 1954–2004: Scholarship in Honor of Richard E. Blackwelder (Marquette, 2006), ed. Wayne G. Hammond and Christina Scull
 Rails as she is spoke (2012), a humorous guide about OOP problems in the Ruby on Rails web application framework, by Giles Bowkett

Contemporary allusions
The phrase English as she is spoke is nowadays used allusively, in a form of linguistic play, as a stereotypical example of bad English grammar.

In January 1864, then US President Abraham Lincoln and Secretary of State William H. Seward laughed as Lincoln's private secretary John Hay read aloud from the book. The book has been cited as one example of many diversions that Lincoln used to lighten his heart and mind from the weight of the US Civil War and his cabinet's political infighting.

The Monty Python sketch "Dirty Hungarian Phrasebook" is a take on the idea, in which a publisher created a Hungarian-English phrasebook with deliberately mistranslated phrases.

The English rock band Cardiacs used passages from the book in their 1999 album Guns, most notably in the songs "Cry Wet Smile Dry" and "Sleep All Eyes Open."

See also
Danglish, a term for commingled English and Danish

Denglisch, a term for commingled English and German (Deutsch)

Dunglish, a term for commingled English and Dutch
 Engrish, broken English common among Japanese and some other Asian learners; frequently entering popular culture
 Franglais, an expression for commingled English and French, from Miles Kington's long-running column in Punch magazine, "Let's parler franglais".
 My postillion has been struck by lightning, a strange phrase often attributed to interlingual style books
 Spanglish, a term for commingled English and Spanish
 Striking and Picturesque Delineations of the Grand, Beautiful, Wonderful, and Interesting Scenery Around Loch-Earn, a 19th-century work in broken English also considered unintentionally humorous

Notes

References

External links 

 
 The New Guide of the Conversation, in Portuguese and English, in Two Parts: full facsimile of the 1855 edition at Google Books
 Plain text ebook of English as She is Spoke at Project Gutenberg
 
 English as she is spoke vs. Babelfish
 English as she is spoke: Idiotisms and Proverbs

1855 books
D. Appleton & Company books
English-language education
Humour
Language textbooks
Portuguese language
Translation
Translation dictionaries